"Creatures That Once Were Men" (literally, "former people") is a 1897 novella by the Russian writer Maxim Gorky. It is regarded as a work of social realism, and it depicts the bottom of Russian society (like Gorky's other early works, including his most famous play The Lower Depths) The novella was included in Gorky's collection Sketches and Stories (1899).

The term "former people" developed other meanings, relating to Russian society.

Plot
Creatures that Once Were Men is a novella about residents of a doss house who start a conflict with their landlord, which leads to an inhumane outcome.

At the end, there's a notable dialogue between the two main characters:

"What are you? Who are you?" shouted Petunikov.

"A man . . ." he answered in a hoarse voice.

Reception

See also
 The Lower Depths

References

External links
 
 Creatures That Once Were Men, in several formats
 Creatures That Once Were Men, via Gutenberg

Short stories by Maxim Gorky
1897 short stories